Juoksuhaudantie is a 2002 novel by Finnish author Kari Hotakainen. It won the Nordic Council's Literature Prize in 2004.

References

2002 novels
21st-century Finnish novels
Finnish-language novels
Nordic Council's Literature Prize-winning works